The Los Angeles crime family, also known as the L.A. Mafia or the Southern California crime family, is an Italian-American organized crime syndicate based in Los Angeles as part of the larger Italian-American Mafia. Since its inception in the early 20th century, it has spread throughout Southern California. Like most Mafia families in the United States, the Los Angeles crime family gained power bootlegging alcohol during the Prohibition era. The L.A. family reached its peak strength in the 1940s and early 1950s under Jack Dragna, although the family was never larger than the New York or Chicago families. The Los Angeles crime family itself has been on a gradual decline, with the Chicago Outfit representing them on The Commission since the death of boss Jack Dragna in 1956.

The sources for much of the current information on the history of the Los Angeles Cosa Nostra family is the courtroom testimony and the published biographies of Aladena "Jimmy the Weasel" Fratianno, who in the late 1970s became the second member – and the first acting boss – in American Mafia history to testify against Mafia members, and The Last Mafioso (1981), a biography of Fratianno by Ovid Demaris. Since the 1980s, the Racketeer Influenced and Corrupt Organizations Act (RICO Act) has been effective in convicting mobsters and shrinking the American Mafia; like all families in the United States, the L.A. Mafia now only holds a fraction of its former power. Not having a strong concentration of Italian-Americans in the region leaves the family to contend with the many street gangs of other ethnicities in the city. The Los Angeles crime family is the last Mafia family left in the state of California.

Origins and predecessors

The early years of organized crime in California were marked by the division of various Italian street gangs such as the Black Hand organizations in the early 20th century. The most prominent of these was the Matranga family. Which were a family of Arbereshe origin from a Albanian noble family which settled in south Italy hundreds of years ago. Their legitimate business was fruit vending. Otherwise they used threats, violence, arson, and extortion to control the Plaza area, which was the heart of the Italian American community of Los Angeles at the time. Its first leader was Rosario "Sam" Matranga (often misreported as "Orsario," due to a typo on his death record), who started leading the family around 1905. Sam's relatives Salvatore Matranga, Pietro "Peter" Matranga, and Antonio "Tony" Matranga were other members of the gang.

When prominent Black Hand leader Joseph Ardizzone was involved in a dispute with George Maisano, a member of the Matranga gang, they both went to Joseph Cuccia to mediate the dispute. Cuccia was a well-respected criminal amongst the underworld, who served as a translator in court for Italians who didn't speak English. This made him a well liked man in the Italian community. Cuccia was a relative of Ardizzone's and ruled in Ardizzone's favor, causing the Matrangas to threaten Cuccia. In response, Ardizzone shot and killed Maisano on July 2, 1906. Ardizzone then fled authorities and became a wanted fugitive.

With Ardizzone gone, the Matrangas fulfilled their promise of revenge. On September 25, 1906, Cuccia was shot and killed, allegedly by Tony Matranga. With both Ardizzone and Cuccia gone, the Matrangas became the dominant criminal force in Italian Plaza community. To expand their power they began cooperating with the police. Giving up information on their enemies and receiving immunity for most of their crimes, the Matrangas were able to expand their power and influence. Ardizzone returned to Los Angeles in 1914 and resumed his feud with the Matranga family. Sam and his successor, Pietro "Peter" Matranga, were both murdered within 33 days of each other in 1917. Mike Marino (aka Mike Rizzo), an Ardizzone ally, was responsible for the murders. While their next leader, cousin Tony Buccola was able to get revenge and kill Marino in 1919, many years of violence ruined the Matranga family. It was becoming clear that Ardizzone's faction was winning the war. With the rise of bootleggers in the 1920s, the Matranga's power declined and was eliminated with Buccola's disappearance in 1930.

Vito Di Giorgio, a Black Handler and grocery store owner, moved to the United States from Palermo, Sicily in 1904, and to Los Angeles from New Orleans in 1920. With the continuing Ardizzone-Matranga feud, Di Giorgio was able to relocate to Los Angeles and bring some order to the Los Angeles underworld. Di Giorgio was known as an intimidating and forceful man who was in conflict with several local underworld factions. Di Giorgio maintained strong connections with mobsters in New Orleans, Colorado, and Chicago, and was a cousin, close friend, and mob associate of New York City mobster Giuseppe Morello, the first boss of the Morello crime family. He survived two attempts on his life before he was murdered in Chicago in 1922 while having a haircut. His underboss Rosario DeSimone, who moved from Pueblo, Colorado to Los Angeles around the same time as Di Giorgio, was another longtime power figure who stayed out of the city and operated bootlegging rackets quietly in Los Angeles County. DeSimone officially stepped down from the top position in the 1920s, but was still a power within the Los Angeles underworld.

Albert Marco seized control of Los Angeles in the 1920s not by working with the local Mafia, but with the "City Hall Gang", a political machine in Los Angeles run by Kent Kane Parrot and Charles H. Crawford. This transformed Marco into the Vice Lord of Los Angeles, earning $500,000 from bordello prostitution alone. With Crawford and Parrot controlling city hall and the local press, the City Hall Gang was able to operate bootlegging, prostitution, and illegal gambling rackets in the shadows with little law enforcement scrutiny. This all changed when Marco was convicted of assault with a deadly weapon in 1928, and the City Hall Gang broke down after a reform movement swept L.A. in the late 1920s. Since then a host of mobsters fought to take control of liquor operations that Marco and the City Hall Gang previously dominated. In 1928, August Palumbo was the seventh bootlegger killed in a six-week period. Palumbo was Marco's former lieutenant and was killed for refusing to fall in line with DeSimone. DeSimone's lieutenant Dominic DiCiolla (aka Dominick De Soto) was acquitted of the murder and took control of Palumbo's liquor operations. When he tried to challenge higher powers by moving in on syndicated gambling rackets, he was murdered in 1931.

History

Joseph "Iron Man" Ardizzone returned to California in 1914 and was acquitted of murdering Maisano in 1915 due to lack of evidence and no witnesses willing to testify. He returned to power and quickly started expanding his rackets in Los Angeles. Ardizzone teamed up with Jack Dragna and they worked closely together for over 10 years. During prohibition the two were successful in running bootlegging operations in Southern California as well as gambling and extortion. By the end of the 1920s he was rapidly expanding his power and influence. Under Ardizzone's tenure, organized crime began consolidating under his banner as he dominated criminal activities in L.A. In the late 1920s, Dragna and Johnny Roselli constantly battled Charlie Crawford for control of the lucrative bootlegging rackets. With the deaths of Buccola and DiCiolla in 1930 and 1931, respectively, Ardizzone (who was a suspect in both murders) was the undisputed leader of crime in L.A. He set up the Italian Protective League, with Dragna as its president, Ardizzone as its vice president, and California State Senator Joseph Pedrotti as its chairman. The organization had some political and social motives, but mostly served as a strong-arm muscle for the crime family. His reign as boss was ended when Ardizzone mysteriously disappeared in 1931 while driving to his cousin's home in Etiwanda.

Dragna era

Jack Dragna took control of the family after Ardizzone's death in 1931, and made peace with the National Mafia Syndicate. In addition, his brother Tom Dragna was made his consigliere while his nephew Louis Tom Dragna became a made man in 1947. Dragna was the most successful boss the L.A. family ever had. Although he wasn't able to infiltrate many of the labor unions in the entertainment industry, he involved the Los Angeles family in the entertainment business, and brought the L.A. Mafia onto the national stage. He was honored with a place on The Commission, the only boss west of Chicago to hold a spot on the council. When prohibition ended in 1933, Dragna operated a massive loan shark and illegal gambling business. Along with close supporter John Roselli, Dragna's Mafia family ended local gang wars by driving older gambling syndicate headed by Guy McAfee and Milton "Farmer" Page out of business. Dragna and Roselli worked with Joe Shaw (the brother of Mayor Frank Shaw) to muscle out L.A. bookies, many of whom fled to Las Vegas. By 1937, the Los Angeles crime family controlled the illegal gambling in Los Angeles.

For independent bookmakers, Dragna would use extortion to collect money from their operations. While most mobsters simply threatened harm on a business for not paying tribute to their organization (protection racket), Dragna's family came up with a more sophisticated course of action. Dragna would send in men to threaten businesses, then the owners would pay Dragna for protection (unaware that these were Dragna's own men). Dragna wasn't however, able to control 100% of independent gambling rackets. Along with Dragna avoiding the spotlight and public life, he often was given the reputation as a weak ruler. According to Mickey Cohen, Dragna was very powerful and very well respected, but did not put things together the way the East Coast bosses preferred. Although there was not as big a pool of Italians to recruit on the West Coast like there was back East, the L.A. family worked around this by accepting members from across the country, such as Johnny Roselli from Chicago, Nick Licata from Detroit, and Aladena "Jimmy the Weasel" Fratianno and Dominic Brooklier from Cleveland. Armed with top hitman Frank Bompensiero and Jimmy Fratianno (who committed over 30 murders on the orders of their superiors), Dragna muscled his way into controlling territory stretching throughout California and Southern Nevada. The Dragna family also had connections within the Los Angeles County Sheriff's Department, who were more corrupt than the city police (LAPD). Although not having a big hand in labor union rackets, the Dragna crime family did infiltrate some unions in the laundromat and dress importing business.

When Lucky Luciano sent Benjamin "Bugsy" Siegel from New York City to Los Angeles to take control of their interests on the West Coast (including Las Vegas), he formed an uneasy partnership with Dragna. Siegel was able to get independent bookies to pay tribute to Dragna's already flourishing gambling business. Aside from this however, Dragna resented Siegel's power to infiltrate unions in the movie industry. Siegel made millions extorting movie production companies and only had to pay Dragna a tribute for working on his territory. With New York on Siegel's side, there was little Dragna could do to take control of The Commission's grip of the city. The main reason Siegel came to California was to organize a horse racing wire service on the West Coast for the National Syndicate, which Siegel and Dragna worked closely together on setting up. Dragna and Siegel tried many methods to take over Continental Press Service (the main wire service at the time). Attempts to buy out the company and to strong arm its owners didn't work, so they set up their own company called Trans-America. The Chicago Outfit eventually took over rival Continental Racing Services and gave the entire percentage of the racing wire on the West Coast to Dragna, enraging Siegel.

Battle of Sunset Strip
Once Siegel ran out of favor with New York, he was ordered to be killed. Although his murder officially remains unsolved, one theory is that Dragna's men were given the order to kill him. After Siegel's death, his chief lieutenant Mickey Cohen took over his remaining  gambling and loan shark operations in Los Angeles. He refused to fall in line behind Dragna and Dragna saw this as an opportunity to eliminate him as Cohen began to create his own crime family that quickly began to rival Dragna's. Dragna first began recruiting Cohen's Italian men such as Dominic Brooklier to his family and killing his other men such as David Ogul, Frank Niccoli, Neddie Herbert, and Harold "Hooky" Rothman. However, through sheer luck, Cohen survived many attempts on his life (John Roselli compared Cohen to Bugs Moran). In 1951, Cohen was imprisoned for tax evasion and the L.A. family moved in on his gambling business.

The number of high-profile murders and gangsters moving into the West Coast, combined with the recall of Mayor Frank L. Shaw because of corruption charges related to organized crime, caused law enforcement to stop accommodating the Mafia. In the late 1930s, California Attorney General Earl Warren took command of a tough assault on Dragna's empire, most notably shutting down the gambling ships run by Anthony Cornero. On February 14, 1950, the California Commission on Organized Crime singled out Dragna as the head of a crime syndicate that controlled crime in Southern California. Soon after, several of his family members were arrested for the bombing of Mickey Cohen's home. Dragna fled the state and was wanted for questioning. He later surrendered, and was questioned in the Kefauver hearings along with Roselli and Bompensiero, but denied all accusations against him. Dragna's family however, remain strong throughout the early 1950s.

DeSimone and Licata

While other Mafia families in the country were prospering in the 1950s, the L.A. family was beginning its decline. When William H. Parker became Chief of Police for the Los Angeles Police Department in 1950, the police started cracking down on organized crime instead of assisting it. The weakened Los Angeles family lost ground to the Chicago Outfit and New York families. Due to over 50 unsolved gangland killings in the first half of the century, the L.A.P.D. formed a special task force to deal with the problem: "The Gangster Squad". This group of men harassed Dragna's family, as well as Cohen's throughout the 1950s. Frank Bompensiero and Jimmy Fratianno started serving prison sentences in 1953 and 1954, respectively. In 1956 Jack Dragna died of a heart attack and a vote was made by the senior members of the family to elect its new boss. Johnny Roselli was seen as the most logical choice, but lawyer-turned-gangster Frank DeSimone was victorious. A disappointed Roselli, who felt that DeSimone rigged the election, transferred back to the Chicago Outfit. Fratianno did the same after his release from prison in 1960.

With Dragna gone and his brother Tom retired after his death, the crime family slipped out of control. It quickly became apparent that DeSimone was an incompetent boss. According to an unidentified informant, he raped the wife of former underboss Girolamo "Momo" Adamo, which caused Adamo to shoot his wife (who survived) and kill himself. This meant the top three men from Dragna's era, the boss, underboss, and consigliere were all inactive in Los Angeles almost immediately after DeSimone took charge. DeSimone was present at the ill-fated Apalachin Meeting with his underboss Simone Scozzari. When the meeting was raided by police, DeSimone was outed as a mobster. He previously had no arrest record and was believed to be a simple lawyer. Scozzari came under law enforcement scrutiny after the meeting and was deported to Italy in 1962 for being an illegal immigrant. By 1965, it was estimated that the number of members of the L.A. family living in Los Angeles dwindled to 30, while the family actually had a strong presence in San Diego. DeSimone worried about "shaking down" gamblers and bookmakers for fear that they would run to the police. In the 1960s, Bonanno crime family Boss Joseph Bonanno plotted to have DeSimone killed for failing to exploit the criminal opportunities in Los Angeles. The plan was thwarted, but caused DeSimone to become very paranoid, never leaving his house at night. DeSimone's unsuccessful reign concluded with his death in 1967, after 11 years in power.

DeSimone's second underboss Nick "Old Man" Licata succeeded him. Licata had strong ties with Mafia families in the Midwest and South and maintained contact with the mob in Las Vegas. By then, law enforcement knew much about mob activities in Los Angeles, which was helped by top hitman Frank Bompensiero becoming an undercover informant in 1967. In 1963 Joe Valachi outed the Mafia as a secret criminal society, aiding in law enforcements attacks on organized crime and fingered Licata as a high ranking mobster in Los Angeles. A bright spot during the period was that Louis Tom Dragna's company "Roberta Dress Manufacturing" was turning into a $10 million a year business. This was possible because in the 1950s, Jack Dragna flew labor union expert Johnny Dio in from New York City to teach Louis how to manipulate labor unions in the Los Angeles Garment District. Licata had high hopes of restoring the declining family, but with the police and FBI constantly monitoring his family, Licata wasn't able to do much of a better job than DeSimone. On July 9, 1969, Licata was taken into custody after refusing to answer questions at a federal grand jury session about L.A.'s crime syndicate structure. He was held in contempt of court for refusing to testify after being given immunity from prosecution and eventually served six months in prison. A pair of indictments in the mid-1970s threaten to put most of the working family in prison. In March 1973, seven men were arrested for running a rigged gambling operation in Los Angeles that brought in up to $250,000 a month. Their trial was delayed when the key informant and witness, former Mafia associate John Dubcek, was shot and killed in Las Vegas. Although this scared other informants from testifying, they still were convicted and given light sentences. Four months later another 12 men, were indicted for conspiracy, racketeering and extortion against bookmakers, loan sharks, and pornographers. Licata's underboss Joseph Dippolito had a large influence in San Bernardino and the Inland Empire in both legitimate and criminal enterprises. He was seen as Licata's successor, but died unexpectedly of a heart attack in January 1974 at the age of 59. On October 19, 1974, after a long battle with illnesses, Nick Licata died at age 77.

Fratianno flips

Licata's successor, Dominic Brooklier, was initially able to stabilize the family's businesses, but later endured considerable damage done by FBI informants. Brooklier was able to make a lot of money in pornography, extortion, and drugs, but wasn't able to take back control of many independent bookmaking rackets in Los Angeles. The Last Mafioso described several instances during the time when the Los Angeles family would shake down movie producers in the porn industry. These producers would then pay a fee to their Mafia backers, usually on the East Coast, to set things straight with the L.A. mob. Once the producers paid, the Mafia backers would secretly split the money with the L.A. family. Brooklier later ordered the death of Frank Bompensiero for his growing criticism of the family, and later finding good evidence that Bompensiero was cooperating with the FBI. When Brooklier was sentenced to a 20-month prison stint along with underboss Samuel Sciortino in 1975, Jimmy Fratianno on Tom Dragna's request, transferred back to the L.A. family from Chicago, and was named co-acting Los Angeles boss with Dragna. Fratianno traveled across the country making new connections and deals. Fratianno's goal was to bring back the ailing L.A. family stature and reputation amongst the Mafia. Since Jack Dragna's 1956 death, Los Angeles was starting to be seen as an "open city" where any Mafia family could do business, but Fratianno hoped that by restoring the ailing family, he would be a candidate to officially run the family after Brooklier was released. However, upon release from prison, Brooklier quickly took back control of the family, and Fratianno was left back to being a low level soldier.

The fall of the Los Angeles family came when Fratianno became the second American Mafioso to turn state's evidence and testify against the Mafia in court. On October 6, 1977, Danny Greene was killed by a car bomb in Ohio, and Ray Ferritto was arrested for the murder. Ferritto implicated Fratianno in the planning of the murder, and Fratianno was indicted for charges related to the bombing. Fearing for his safety, Fratianno agreed to become a government witness against the Mafia. In return for his testimony, he pleaded guilty to the murder charges and received a five-year prison sentence, of which he served 21 months. In 1980, after testifying for the government that led to the racketeering convictions of five reputed Mafia figures, Fratianno entered the federal Witness Protection Program. Fratianno claimed that the Mafia had a $100,000 contract on his life. Brooklier, who didn't trust Fratianno, ordered the hit because Fratianno had claimed he was presenting himself as boss of the family, and felt that he was trying to usurp him. Fratianno testified against mobsters not only in Los Angeles, but across the entire country. Although the Justice Department thought it finally crippled the Mafia in Los Angeles, a Federal Judge gave Brooklier, Sciortino, Michael Rizzitello, Dragna, and Jack LoCicero light sentences ranging from two to five years in 1981 for racketeering and extortion. Brooklier still ran the family from his prison cell until he died of a heart attack in 1984. With Brooklier's imprisonment, capo Peter Milano quickly stepped up and began running the family in 1981.

The Milano brothers

Peter Milano was officially made boss of the Los Angeles crime family with Brooklier's death in 1984. He made his brother Carmen "Flipper" Milano his underboss. Since Milano's reign, the family was heavily involved in narcotics, pornography, gambling and loan sharking. 20 reputed organized crime figures were arrested in 1984, in what law enforcement officials said was a bid to take over a $1 million-a-week bookmaking operation in Los Angeles. Neither of the Milano brothers (nor six of the others originally arrested) were charged due to lack of evidence. When Peter Milano became boss, he rejuvenated the depleted family by inducting new members such as Stephen "Steve the Whale" Cino, singer Charles "Bobby Milano" Caci, Luigi "Louie" Gelfuso Jr. and shylock brothers Lawrence and Anthony "The Animal" Fiato into the family. Mobster turned informant Kenny Gallo credited the brothers with "help[ing] Pete Milano revamp the L.A. Family". With a beefed up family Milano succeeded in having nearly every bookie in Los Angeles pay a mob tax to the L.A. family. Robert "Puggy" Zeichick gave Anthony Fiato a $1 million loan which was used to finance a huge loan shark operation. The L.A. family became the dominant loan shark operators in the area. The family's influence stretched all the way to Las Vegas, where they had long standing ties to what the Mafia considered an "open city" where any family could work.

The entire hierarchy of the family including the Milano brothers, captains Mike Rizzitello, Jimmy Caci, and Luigi Gelfuso along with many other mobsters were arrested on various charges in the late 1980s, due largely to information and recordings collected by the Fiato brothers. These charges to so many members permanently crippled the family and put the family on the brink of extinction. While Rizzitello, who was acquitted of his original charges at trial, was sentenced to 33 years in prison in 1989 for attempted murder (where he would die in 2005) the Milano brothers pleaded guilty to lesser charges; Peter received a six-year prison sentence and Carmen received six months. Almost every member of the family charged pleaded guilty to receive lesser sentences and the F.B.I. considered the Mafia finished in Los Angeles.

However, since Peter Milano's paroled release in 1991, he took back control of the weakened family. The Los Angeles family since made moves into Las Vegas with the Buffalo crime family. The family made headlines again with the murder of Chicago Outfit associate Herbert "Fat Herbie" Blitzstein by Buffalo and Los Angeles family associates in 1997. Blizstein had a lucrative loan shark and auto insurance fraud business the two families moved in to take over. This caused a great deal of scrutiny from the FBI on both families. Members like Stephen Cino and Alfred Mauriello were convicted on related charges along with other associates who cooperated with officials to receive a reduced sentence, putting the L.A. crime family on its last leg. By the 1990s the L.A. family was estimated to have 20 official members.

Latest position
Much of the crime family's activities have become unknown since the Las Vegas indictments. Law enforcement has moved its attention of organized crime towards street gangs such as Mexican and African American gangs who are far more prevalent and widespread. Until his death, Peter Milano was still believed to be the official Boss of the Los Angeles crime family. However, since the late 1990s, his involvement in crime along with other members had become greatly reduced. Some members, like Rocco Zangari and Russell Massetia, moved out of the state and left the family altogether. Other members, like Carmen Milano and Jimmy Caci died of old age with no younger people having to replace them. Los Angeles doesn't have a high concentration of Italians like the East Coast to support them, so recruiting new members is challenging. With Southern California's many racial groups, La Cosa Nostra faced an uphill battle to challenge the many street gangs in the area over criminal rackets. Law enforcement also considers East Coast Mafia members moving to California as a threat.

Tommaso "Tommy" Gambino, a Los Angeles-based prosecco magnate and son of Rosario Gambino, has been the reputed boss of the family since 2012. According to informants for the FBI and the Royal Canadian Mounted Police (RCMP), the Canadian gangster and Musitano crime family associate Albert Iavarone was inducted into the Los Angeles family shortly before he was shot dead in Hamilton, Ontario on September 13, 2018.

Historical leadership

Boss (official and acting) 

 1922–1925: Rosario DeSimone – stepped down.
 1925–1931: Joseph "Iron Man" Ardizzone – murdered.
 1931–1956: Jack Dragna – died on February 23, 1956.
 1956–1967: Frank DeSimone
 1967–1974: Nicolo "Old Man Nick" Licata
 1974–1984: Dominic "Jimmy" Brooklier – imprisoned 1975–1977, 1981–1984, died in 1984.
Acting 1975–1977: Aladena "Jimmy The Weasel" Fratianno
Acting 1981–1984: Peter Milano – became official boss.
 1984–2012: Peter Milano
 2012–present: Tommaso "Tommy" Gambino

Underboss 
 1925–1931: Jack Dragna
 1931–1956: Girolamo "Momo" Adamo – demoted.
 1956–1962: Simone "Sam" Scozzari
 1962–1967: Nicolo "Old Man Nick" Licata
 1967–1974: Joseph "Joe Dip" Dippolito
 1974: Dominic "Jimmy" Brooklier
 1974–1979: Samuel Sciortino
 1984–2006: Carmen Milano
 2006–2012: Tommaso "Tommy" Gambino

Consigliere 
 1931–1956: Gaetano "Tom" Dragna
 1956–1962: Nicolo "Old Man Nick" Licata
 1962–1975: Thomas "Tommy" Palermo
 1975–1977: Frank "Bomp" Bompensiero
 1977–1982: Giacomo "Jack" LoCicero

Current family members

Administration

 Boss – Tommy Gambino – current boss, he took over after former boss Peter Milano's death.
 Underboss – Unknown
 Consigliere – Unknown

Soldiers

 Michael "Porno Mike" Esposito – Los Angeles based soldier, Michael Esposito owns the porn production and distribution company "Gentlemen's Video". His father, Salvatore Esposito, was a driver for former Lucchese family boss Anthony Corallo.
 Leonard "Limping Lenny" Montana Jr. – Los Angeles based soldier, son of Lenny Montana, "Limping Lenny" is a bookie and owns "Enzo's Pizzeria" in Westwood.
 Davalito Montemarano – Los Angeles based soldier.

Notes

References

 
 
 
 Gaines, Lee. "LA Crime File" Gate City Publishing (2004)

Further reading
 Gallo, Kenny, Randazzo, Matthew. Breakshot: A Life in the 21st Century American Mafia. Phoenix Books, 2009. 
 Moore, Judith. A Bad, Bad Boy: The Most Feared Mobster in Southern California for 30 Years. Reader Books, 2009. 
 Smith, John L. The Animal in Hollywood. Barricade Books. 1998.

External links
 Los Angeles Descriptions of historical Italian gang leaders of Los Angeles
 Mob Murders in L.A. – Addresses of what the L.A.P.D. said were Mafia killings from 1906 to 1951.
 Cosa Nostra guys Louie Caruso Pete Milano Jimmy Caci Bobby Milano Keely Smith video by Kenny Gallo published on YouTube.
 Will the last guy left in L.A. mob please turn out the lights? – John L. Smith, Las Vegas Review-Journal. November 16, 1997

 
Organizations established in the 1900s
1900s establishments in California
Italian-American crime families
Gangs in Los Angeles
Italian-American culture in Los Angeles